Rift Valley United Football Club is an association football club based in Eldoret, Kenya. The club currently competes in the Kenyan National Super League, and was known as Hotsprings Football Club until 31 March 2014.

Stadium
The club currently plays its home games at the Kipchoge Keino Stadium in Eldoret, Uasin Gishu.

References

External links
 

Kenyan National Super League clubs
FKF Division One clubs
Football clubs in Kenya